Best Peak is a peak,  high, standing southwest of Illusion Point, Fortuna Bay, on the north coast of South Georgia. The name appears to be first used on a 1931 British Admiralty chart.

References
 

Mountains and hills of South Georgia